Mechling is a surname. Notable people with the surname include:

Edward Mechling (1878–1938), American middle-distance runner
Gene Mechling (1909–1975), American basketball player
Heinrich Mechling (1892–1976), German footballer

See also
Mechlin (disambiguation)